The Statue of Liberty Museum is located on Liberty Island in New York City. The museum opened on May 16, 2019, and is focused on the creation, meaning, and history of the Statue of Liberty (formally Liberty Enlightening the World), a large statue by Frédéric Auguste Bartholdi which the people of France gave to the people of the United States in 1886.

Exhibits

The original torch, carried by Liberty from 1886 to 1984, is located in the museum. The museum includes exhibits relating to the statue's construction and history, and a theater where visitors can watch an aerial view of the statue. The exhibits include more than 500 photographs and graphics from more than 100 different sources. Examples include rare historic photos of the statue's construction from the Musée Bartholdi in Colmar, France, and sketches of early designs for the pedestal from the Library of Congress. The exhibition was designed by the New York firm ESI Design.

Funding
The museum was funded privately by Diane von Fürstenberg, Michael Bloomberg, Jeff Bezos, Coca-Cola, NBCUniversal, the family of Laurence Tisch and Preston Robert Tisch, Mellody Hobson, and George Lucas. Von Fürstenberg headed the fundraising for the museum, and the project raised more than $40 million in fundraising as of its October 6, 2016, groundbreaking.

Construction 
Construction of the new Statue of Liberty Museum started in early October 2016. The $70 million  museum can accommodate all of the island's daily visitors, while the former museum could hold only 20 percent.

The museum was designed by FXCollaborative, and is integrated with the parkland around it.

Upon the museum's opening, tour guides were banned from certain parts of the island, including part of the museum.

In media
The construction of the museum, and Diane von Furstenberg's role in its funding, are featured in the 2019 documentary Liberty: Mother of Exiles.

See also
 List of single-artist museums
 Musée Bartholdi

References

External links
 

2019 establishments in New York City
Museums established in 2019
Museums in New York City
Museums devoted to one artist
Museum
France–United States relations